The Pakistan National Rugby Championship is an annual domestic rugby competition played in Pakistan. It involves the country's six rugby-playing state departments as well as the six provincial unions.
The Pakistan Army are the current holders, having won 24-10 against Punjab Greens in the final of the 2012 edition.

Teams
Balochistan
FATA
Higher Education Commission
Islamabad RA
Khyber Pakhtunkhwa
Punjab
Sindh
Pakistan Army
Pakistan Navy
Pakistan Police
Pakistan Railways
Water and Power Development Authority (WAPDA)

References

Pakistani rugby union competitions